Jown Anderson Cardona Agudelo (born 9 January 1995) is a Colombian footballer who plays as a midfielder for Chinese Super League team Guangzhou City.

Career statistics

References

External links

1995 births
Living people
Colombian footballers
Colombian expatriate footballers
Association football midfielders
Sportspeople from Valle del Cauca Department
Deportivo Cali footballers
Cortuluá footballers
Ceará Sporting Club players
Deportivo Pasto footballers
Club León footballers
Once Caldas footballers
Guangzhou City F.C. players
Categoría Primera A players
Liga MX players
Campeonato Brasileiro Série A players
Chinese Super League players
Colombian expatriate sportspeople in Brazil
Colombian expatriate sportspeople in Mexico
Colombian expatriate sportspeople in China
Expatriate footballers in Brazil
Expatriate footballers in Mexico
Expatriate footballers in China